Tell Kashashok (أخبر كاشكاشوك) is an archaeological site in the Khabur River Valley, of Northern Syria. The site is dated by pottery finds to the latter neolithic era, and early Dynastic era. The site was excavated by the Directorate General of Antiquities of Syria in 1987 and 1988. The Early Dynastic era includes a destruction layer, and an early adoption of cuneiform. It may have been known in antiquity as Kiš. A few clay numerical tablets from the EB III were found.

References

Further reading
"Tell Abu Hğaira (Syrian dig)", Syria 72, 1995, p. 183-190 (= CAAS II); "The Temples of Tell Kashashok and Tell Abu Hujeira", Mr. Al-Maqdissi, M. Abdul Karim, A. Al-Azm & M. Al-Khoury (ed.), The Syrian Jezireh. Cultural Heritage and Interrelations. Proceedings of the International Held Conference at Deir ez-Zor (22nd-25th  April, 1996), Damascus, 2002, p. 45-55 (= DAS I), in Arabic.
Tall Kash-Kashok, H. Weiss, Ed., The Origins of North Mesopotamian Civilization: Ninevite  Chronology, Economy, Society (Yale Symposium, 1988), Yale, 1988; AT.  Suleyman & A.  Taraqji, "Tell Kashkashuk at the time of Halaf", S. Cluzan, E. Delpont & J. Mouliérac (dir.), Syria, memory and civilization, Paris, 1993, p. 48; "Tell Kashkashouk", Syria  72, 1995, p. 170-183 (= CAAS II); "The Temples at Tell Kashashok in the Third Millennium BC", op. cit. not. 3, p. 321–322; "The Temples of Tell Kashashok and Tell Abu Hujeira", ibid., pp. 45–55.

Kashashok
Kashashok
Kashashok
Kashashok
Kashashok